Alexander or Alex Wylie may refer to:

Alexander Wylie (missionary) (1815–1887), British Christian missionary in China.
Alexander Wylie, Lord Kinclaven, Scottish judge
Alexander Wylie (politician) (1838–1921), British MP for Dunbartonshire, 1895–1906
 Alex Wylie (footballer) (1872–1902), Scottish footballer for St Mirren 
Alex Wylie (cricketer), English cricketer

See also
Alexander Wiley, U.S. senator for Wisconsin
Alex Wyllie, New Zealand rugby union coach